LRAC may refer to:

 Long run average cost
 LRAC 89 and LRAC 73, French shoulder-fired rocket launchers